Now That's What I Call Music! 34 was released on June 15, 2010. The album is the 34th edition of the (U.S.) Now! series. Four tracks, "Nothin' on You", "Rude Boy", "OMG" and "Imma Be", reached number one on the Billboard Hot 100. The final four tracks are "What's Next New Music Preview" bonus tracks.

Now! 34 debuted at number four on the Billboard 200 albums chart with sales of 88,000 copies sold. This marks the first Now album to sell less than 100,000 copies in its first week since the first volume of the Now series in 1998. In November 2010, the album was certified Gold by the RIAA.

Track listing

Reception

Andy Kellman of Allmusic calls the addition of the so-called bonus tracks alarming. With 16 hits and near hits and four "bonus tracks", this Now That's What I Call Music collection "is 20 percent Tomorrow That's What I Might Call Music."

Charts

Weekly charts

Year-end charts

References

External links
 Official U.S. Now That's What I Call Music website

2010 compilation albums
 034
EMI Records compilation albums